Viva FM is a radio station broadcasting on 95.3 MHz serving Ptolemaida, Kozani, Western Macedonia. The station is a mixture of dance and Top 40, much of the hits are Τop 40. The station launched broadcasting on 8 March 1999. The main audience covers the age groups 15-45 financially independent with high educational level who reside in urban centres. His music program is determined by the current trends, in the international music scene, while promoting and radio hits that will make a difference in the future.

Slogan
Its slogan is The best way is the music way!

External links
Viva FM Website

Radio stations in Greece